Carlos Moyá and Juan Carlos Ferrero were the defending champions, but were eliminated in the round-robin competition.

Sébastien Grosjean and Michaël Llodra won the title, defeating Paul Haarhuis and Andriy Medvedev in the final, 6–4, 3–6, [10–8].

Draw

Final

Group A
Standings are determined by: 1. number of wins; 2. number of matches; 3. in three-players-ties, percentage of sets won, or of games won; 4. steering-committee decision.

Group B
Standings are determined by: 1. number of wins; 2. number of matches; 3. in three-players-ties, percentage of sets won, or of games won; 4. steering-committee decision.

References
Main Draw

Legends Under 45 Doubles